Larry Elkins is an American politician. He is a Republican representing District 5 in the Kentucky House of Representatives.

Early life 

Elkins was born in Murray, Kentucky. He served in the United States Army. He holds a degree from Murray State University.

Political career 

Elkins was elected to represent the 5th district in the Kentucky House of Representatives in 2018. He is not seeking re-election in 2020.

Electoral record

References 

Living people
Republican Party members of the Kentucky House of Representatives
Murray State University alumni
Year of birth missing (living people)
21st-century American politicians